Sangkhalok ceramic wares are ancient Thai traditional ceramic wear specifically derived from Sukhothai kingdom period. Decorated with traditional motifs, and fired at 1,150-1,280 °C, made into pottery, jar, teapot, spoon, and ceramic doll. The technique of manufacturing and firing dates from the beginning of Sukhothai period (1238-1351) through the end of Ayutthaya kingdom (1351 – 1767) according to evidence of ancient kiln that appear around Si Satchanalai District in Phranakhon Sukhothai province, Thailand.

History 
The determination of the age of Sangkhalok ware from evidence found from the Sangkhalok ware with a green ceramic ware of China in the Yuan Dynasty vessel that sank beneath the gulf of Thailand with the title Rang Kwian. Set its origin of the early 19th century and compare chinaware and pottery of Chinese Ming Dynasty found in the Philippines. The Sangkhalok ware set to last between 18th-19th centuries, the production of Sangkhalok ware from the Sukhothai period. But has been promoting the product and expanding mass production in the Ayutthaya kingdom period. Sangkhalok ware production declined since the 23th century. The key reason is that the marketplace is changing need of Sangkhalok ware, the Chinese returned to manufacture porcelain blue – white, which became a popular trade and Ayutthaya can’t produce as to the demands of Westerners who have a political role in the region.

Terminology 
The term Sangkhalok is assumed from different source. Some of that comes from the word "Song kolok" means stove envelope. Some say those come from the word "Sankoroku" in Japanese, which might came from the word “Sawankhalok”. That was a popular name in city of Si satchanalai in Thai history. The original meaning limited in area of Si satchanalai and the relationship city like Ayuthaya referent from founding many stove manufacturers in this area. However furnace manufacturers
in northern Thailand has produced many of the category called Sangkhalok as well.

Feature 
The pottery is made in very fine ceramic and glazed signature Kai Ka color (ไข่กา, green olive colour. Literally translated to Crow's egg), and a grain ivory stripes. The evolution of coated
green exquisite pottery making has named Green as "Celadon" which
painted a different color, such as green olives.

Category 
The pattern of Sangkhalok ware is divided into many
different types due many techniques of manufacturing, such as;
 The high strength unglazed ceramic ware, decorated with motif by pressure print a molding technique and attach to a pottery before burn, may be the first invented technique and decent to the period after.
 The dark brown glazed pottery, the characteristic and color similar to pottery from Lopburi in brown glazed types
 The white glazed pottery with beautiful draw motif under the glaze in brown, similar to Chinese’s Shu Jol pottery
 The white glazed pottery with beautiful draw motif above the glaze in golden brown
 The strong unglazed pottery half stone ware dip in mud water then draw with red motif
 The green glazed pottery or the Celadon, decorated by draw chamfer into the surface then glaze and bure

Manufacturing

Location 
The manufacturing places are usually found located in Si Satchanalai district in Sukhothai province, in the ancient time the area was once called Si Satchanalai kiln area as an evidence of ancient kilns were found scattered through the area

Material 
The main material for manufacturing the Sangkhalok ware mostly is clay and mud from the local area around the kiln area which is sediment from river

Molding 
The process to creating the primary shape of the pottery is usually done by a high-skilled craftsman who possesses a long time of training experience. the primary tool of this kind of pottery-maker is bare hand for curving any desire shape. the create shape method popular among the current craftsman is to doing on molding on a spinning wheel, as it keep spinning it can possesses perfect symmetrical. For an easier molding, the craftsman always use water assist, to keep the work wet for soften the mud and to obtain a smooth surface. another tool for assist molding is cutting wire and trowel.

Coloring 
Motifs that appear in Sangkhalok ware are specific pattern. for dishes and bowl usually are fish, flower, wheel, especial the fish assumed that a Black sharkminnow. The hand drawing style is very distinguished and identical to local culture artist style. The coloring usually is achieved by dipping in or blushing with color made of powder that when burned at a particular temperature will set the desired color.

Firing 
the Firing process to harden the structure and create color on the piece of work will do in air-assist method in a kiln call Thu-riang (Thai: ทุเรียง) that the piece of work will be arrange in oval and burn in temperature at 1150-1280 °C which need to be precise that it will effectively indicate the outcome of the shape-perfects and color.

Gallery

References 

Thai pottery
Sukhothai Kingdom